Malcolm Byrne (born 25 April 1974) is an Irish Fianna Fáil politician who has served as a Senator for the Cultural and Educational Panel since April 2020. He previously served as a Teachta Dála (TD) for the Wexford constituency from 2019 to 2020. 

He was elected to the Dáil in a by-election in November 2019, but lost his seat in the subsequent general election in February 2020. He was a member of Wexford County Council from 2009 to 2019.

Early life
Born in Gorey, County Wexford, in 1974. Byrne is the eldest child from a family of five. He attended CBS Secondary and Loreto and CBS Primary Schools in Gorey, later studying law at University College Dublin. He was secretary of the Kevin Barry Cumann while at UCD.

Byrne has described the 1989 Tiananmen Square protests and massacre and the fall of the Berlin Wall as influencing his decision to enter politics.

He was Head of Communications with the Higher Education Authority until 2019, and has been Vice-President of the National Youth Council of Ireland, Education Officer of the Union of Students in Ireland and a former executive member of the European Students' Union. In 2014, he was named as one of the European 40 Under 40, in the European Young Leaders Programme.

Political career
When first elected to Gorey Town Council on the first count in 1999, he was its youngest member at the age of 25. He topped the poll again at the 2004 local elections. He was first elected to Wexford County Council in 2009 for the Gorey local electoral area, and elected Chairman following his 2014 re-election.

Byrne is openly gay. In January 2006, The Sun included his picture on the cover of its Irish edition beneath the headline "Bertie's FF Man in Gay Web Shame." The "Gay Web Shame" alleged by the tabloid proved on closer examination to simply be a profile on the dating website Gaydar. Byrne responded at the time: "I have not, nor have I ever, done anything illegal and I am not a hypocrite in any way. My views on gay rights issues are well known. I am not married with four children or anything like that, so there is no suggestion of hypocrisy." His family and political career suffered as a result and he was not selected for candidacy in the 2007 general election following this incident. Byrne later described how it was a journalist from The Gorey Echo had first approached him: "The first few questions were about roads. Then the journalist said, 'Are you aware you have a profile on this dating website?'" When he confirmed that the profile was his, Byrne experienced a sleepless night before The Gorey Echo outed him locally: "I was ringing around people I knew and my parents were ringing around people … my grandmother didn't know and a lot of my extended family and my friends didn't know". Gorey Echo group editor Tom Mooney defended publication by saying he believed Byrne's behaviour to be "unfitting of a public representative".

Byrne was a candidate for Fianna Fáil in the 2016 general election in the Wexford constituency, but did not win a seat.

He contested the 2019 European Parliament election for Fianna Fail in the South constituency, having unexpectedly beaten Cork TD Billy Kelleher in the vote for the party's nomination. However, Kelleher was later added to the ticket. Fianna Fáil then divided the constituency geographically, asking people in counties Carlow, Kilkenny, Laois, Offaly, Tipperary, Waterford, Wexford and Wicklow to vote for Byrne, and those in counties Cork, Kerry, Clare and Limerick to vote for Kelleher. Kelleher won 11.69% of the first preference votes (FPV) and was elected on the 17th count. Byrne won 9.62% of the FPV, was eliminated on the 16th Count.

Byrne was elected as a TD at the 2019 Wexford by-election. Andrew Bolger was co-opted to Byrne's seat on Wexford County Council following his election to the Dáil. His maiden speech was about housing solutions and the need to address the challenges facing Generation Rent. In an interview he said he could envisage a United Ireland where the 12th of July and Saint Patrick's Day were public holidays and spoke about how Ireland needs to ensure Unionists feel at home in a new agreed state and that may mean addressing issues such as Ireland joining the Commonwealth.

Byrne lost his Dáil seat at the next general election, on 8 February 2020, following what he called "a dirty campaign". His defeat after only 71 days made him the TD with the second-shortest term of service, after the Anti H-Block TD Kieran Doherty, who died on hunger strike in August 1981 only 52 days after his election.

On 31 March 2020, Byrne was elected to Seanad Éireann at the 2020 election. He was named as Fianna Fáil Spokesperson on Higher Education, Innovation and Science by Taoiseach Micheál Martin in July 2020.

As a Senator, Byrne has been a vocal critic of human rights abuses in China. In February 2021, he became co-chair of the Inter-Parliamentary Alliance on China, along with Senator Barry Ward of Fine Gael.

Personal life
As of 2020, Byrne is single and has described politics as "almost like an addiction", which makes relationships difficult. He lives in Gorey.

References

External links
Malcolm Byrne's page on the Fianna Fáil website

 

1974 births
Living people
Alumni of University College Dublin
Fianna Fáil TDs
Gay politicians
LGBT conservatism
LGBT legislators in Ireland
Local councillors in County Wexford
Members of the 32nd Dáil
People from Gorey
Politicians from County Wexford
Members of the 26th Seanad
Fianna Fáil senators